Solair I and Solair II are two German-designed electric aircraft.

Solair 1
The human piloted Solair I was developed from 1980 by Günther Rochelt - developer of the Musculair human-powered aircraft series - based on a Hans Farner canard design. The aircraft first flew at Unterwössen, Germany on 21 August 1983. It flew for 5 hours and 41 minutes, "mostly on solar energy and also thermals". The aircraft is now displayed at the German Museum in Munich. The newly developed piloted Solair II made its first flight in May 1998 and further test flights that summer but the propulsion system overheated too fast. Development stopped when Günther Rochelt suddenly died in September 1998.

Solair II
The Solair II project began in 1996, and aimed to develop a higher-powered successor aircraft. Modelled on glider construction, the aircraft has a V-tail tail, and fin headed on each propeller for propulsion. The aircraft was manufactured in half-shells sandwich construction with honeycomb cores. With charged batteries, it required an input of 755 W power for the straight flight.
Wingspan: 20.00 m, wing area: 17.00 m², fuselage length: 6.12 m
Empty weight: 140 kg
Maximum take off weight (MTOW): 230 kg
Solar generator
Solar cells: 13,44 m² Mono-crystalline silicon cells
Max efficiency: 17.3%
Max power (radiation 500 W / m²): 1163 W
Drive
2 x permanent magnet DC motor with pusher propeller (1.46 m diameter) in the tail
Nominal voltage: 30 V each (motors in series connected)
Max power: 2 × 4500 W
Used 2 × 4 kW motors with 2-sheet folding propellers (2 m diameter) with pitch after a modification
Batteries
Battery type: 54 cells in series 2-4 of battery packs parallel, voltage: 65 V
Capacity: Max 4 × 5.2 AH 20.8 = Ah, storable energy: Max 1352 WH

See also
Musculair

References

Electric aircraft
Canard aircraft
High-wing aircraft
Single-engined pusher aircraft
Solar-powered aircraft
Aircraft first flown in 1983